Laceys Creek is a rural locality in the Moreton Bay Region, Queensland, Australia.

History 
The locality takes its name from the creek. The creek in turn was originally called Bullon Creek, but later changed to  Leacys Creek, referring to John Leacy, the selector of Portion 117A, Parish of Samsonvale, on 17 April 1879. The current name is a corruption of Leacys.

Lacey's Creek Provisional School opened on 1 January 1898. On 1 January 1909, it became Lacey's Creek State School.  It closed on 25 August 1963. It was at 6 Wirths Road (approx ).

The median age of the Laceys Creek population was 41 years, 4 years above the national median of 37. 84.2% of people living in Laceys Creek were born in Australia. The other top responses for country of birth were England 4%, Germany 1.2%, Hungary 1.2%, New Zealand 1.2%, Papua New Guinea 1.2%. 95.5% of people spoke only English at home; 2% of people spoke Hungarian at home.

Education 
There are no schools in Laceys Creek. The nearest primary school is in neighbouring Dayboro. The nearest secondary schools are in Bray Park and Narangba.

References

Further reading 
 

Suburbs of Moreton Bay Region
Localities in Queensland